Josvainiai Eldership is a Lithuanian eldership, located in the southern part of Kėdainiai District Municipality.

Eldership was created from the Josvainiai selsovet in 1993.

Geography
The territory of Josvainiai Eldership is located mostly in the Nevėžis Plain, but the western edges are in the East Samogitian Plateau. Relief is mostly flat, 2/3 of the territory is agriculture lands, about 1/3 is covered by forests.

 Rivers: Nevėžis (with Upytė), Šušvė with its tributaries (Liedas, Putnupys, Vikšrupis), Smilgaitis, Aluona.
 Lakes and ponds: Bedugnė Lake, Angiriai Reservoir.
 Forests: Pernarava-Šaravai Forest, Josvainiai Forest.
 Protected areas: Šušvė Landscape Sanctuary, Laučynė Landscape Sanctuary, Aluona Hydrographical Sanctuary, Pavikšrupys Botanical Zoological Sanctuary, Šušvė Geomorphological Sanctuary, Dotnuva-Josvainiai Forest Biosphere Polygon.
 Nature monuments: Šaravai Oak Tree

Places of interest
Catholic church of All Saints in Josvainiai, wooden Catholic church of the Sacred Heart of Jesus in Šaravai
Ancient burial places in Čiukiškiai, Ruseiniai, Graužiai and Sviliai
Former manor site in Sviliukai
Jasnagurka Manor barn
Josvainiai Jewish cemetery

Populated places 
Following settlements are located in the Josvainiai Eldership (as for 2011 census):

Towns: Josvainiai
Villages: Angiriai · Bajėnai I · Bajėnai II · Barsukynė · Būdai · Būdviečiai · Čiukiškiai · Daubarai · Degimai · Gailiakaimis · Galulaukiai · Grašva · Graužiai · Graužiai · Ivaniškiai · Jasnagurka · Josvainiai · Juodkaimiai · Kampai I · Kampai II · Karūnava · Kilbisai · Kunioniai · Macgaliai · Maleikoniai · Mikališkiai · Paaluonė · Paliepiai · Paliepiukai · Pavikšrupys · Pažiedupys · Plaktiniai · Ruseinėliai · Ruseiniai · Skaistgiriai · Sviliai · Sviliukai · Šaravai · Šingaliai · Vainikai · Varnupė · Vincentava
Hamlets: Antanava · Pasmilgys · Prapuoleniai

References

Elderships in Kėdainiai District Municipality